Ras-related protein Rab-10 is a protein that in humans is encoded by the RAB10 gene.

Interactions 

RAB10 has been shown to interact with AP1S1.

References

Further reading